Malaya Lipovka is a rural locality (a village) and the administrative center of Lipovskoye Rural Settlement of Velsky District, Arkhangelsk Oblast, Russia. The population was 342 as of 2014. There are 6 streets.

Geography 
Malaya Lipovka is located 99 km north of Velsk (the district's administrative centre) by road. Zalemenga is the nearest rural locality.

References 

Rural localities in Velsky District
Shenkursky Uyezd